The 2016 PLDT Home Ultera PSL Invitational Cup was the first indoor volleyball tournament for the Philippine Super Liga's fourth season. It ran from February 18 to April 9, 2016, coinciding with the UAAP Season 78 volleyball tournaments. A guest team from Thailand, playing under the name Est Cola, joined the final round, clashing against top three teams of the preliminary round for the championship. LVPI Director Jeff Tamayo was the guest speaker of the opening ceremonies, while LVPI President Joey Romasanta and Sports5 head Patricia Bermudez-Hizon attended the awarding ceremonies.

The tournament marked the return of the Philippine Army Lady Troopers (now playing under the name of another PSL team, RC Cola) to the PSL.

Teams

Classification round
The format of the classification round was similar to the FIVB World Grand Prix.

|}

|}

Final round
In the final round, the teams competed using a single round-robin format.

|}

|}

Final standing

Individual awards

Venues
Filoil Flying V Arena (main venue)
Malolos Sports and Convention Center, Malolos, Bulacan
Alonte Sports Arena, Biñan, Laguna
Batangas City Sports Center, Batangas City, Batangas
Imus Sports Complex, Imus, Cavite

Broadcast partners
Sports5: TV5, AksyonTV, Hyper (SD and HD), Sports5.ph

Broadcast Notes for Final Round

References

External links
PSL website

2016 PSL season
PSL
PSL